Saint Barthélemy cuisine mainly revolves around French cuisine, West Indian cuisine, Creole cuisine, Italian cuisine and Asian cuisine. The island has over 70 restaurants serving many dishes and others are a significant number of gourmet restaurants; many of the finest restaurants are located in the hotels. There are also a number of snack restaurants which the French call "les snacks" or "les petits creux" which include sandwiches, pizzas and salads. West Indian cuisine, steamed vegetables with fresh fish is common; Creole dishes tend to be spicier. The island hosts gastronomic events throughout the year, with dishes such as spring roll of shrimp and bacon, fresh grilled lobster, Chinese noodle salad with coconut milk, and grilled beef fillet etc. Notable restaurants include Eddy's, located opposite the Anglican church in Gustavia which serves colonial Southeast Asian cuisine, La Mandala in Gustavia serving far eastern cuisine, Le Repaire on the harbor in Gustavia serving Creole food, K'fe Massai in Centre'lOasis in Lorient inspired by French North Africa, Maya's in Saint Jean which serves French Creole cuisine, Zanzibarth in Saint Jean which serves French, Belgian and Italian cuisine and Do Brasil on Shell Beach, based on Brazilian and Thai cuisine.

St. Barts is popular with wine connoisseurs and contains La Cave de Saint Bathelemy in Marigot which is reportedly one of the largest in Caribbean at around 6,000 square feet. The cellar stocks some 250,000 bottles including 300 varieties of French wine. A notable wine store Vinissimo is located on the Rue de Bord de Mer in Gustavia and stocks around 400,000 bottles of wine. Also of note is Le Gout du Vin on the Rue du Roi Oscar II in Gustavia which stocks Laurent Perrier champagnes and Bouchard Pere et Fils Burgundy wine, as well as a range of other wines including Italian, Spanish, Australian and Chilean.

References

Bibliography

Saint Barthélemy culture
Saint Barthélemy
Saint Barthélemy